Olbracht Łaski (died 23 November 1604) was a Polish nobleman, an alchemist and courtier during the reign of Stephen Batory.

Łaski was suspected of plotting to seize the Polish throne in 1575, following the brief reign of Henry Valois. This episode is featured in the opéra-comique Le roi malgré lui by Emmanuel Chabrier (first performed on 18 May 1887).

Łaski was particularly notable for his fine beard, which Holinshed noted was of "such length and breadth, as that lying in his bed, and parting it with his hands, the same overspread his breasts and shoulders, himself greatly delighting therein, and reputing it an ornament."

Łaski arrived in England in April 1583. The French ambassador, Michel de Castelnau suggested that his visit was prompted by a desire to persuade the Muscovy Company to refrain from selling arms to Ivan the Terrible. He was provided with lodgings at Winchester House, Southwark. Łaski convinced John Dee to visit Poland.

Footnotes

References
 Count Albert Laski
 Ryszard Zieliński, Roman Żelewski (1982) Olbracht Łaski: Od Kieżmarku do Londynu, Warsaw: Czytelnik,

Further reading
 

1527 births
1604 deaths
16th-century alchemists
16th-century Polish people
17th-century alchemists
Olbracht
Secular senators of the Polish–Lithuanian Commonwealth
Polish alchemists
People from Kežmarok
Polish courtiers